University of Preston or Preston University can refer to the following institutions:

Preston Institute of Management Science and Technology, a Pakistani institute of higher education
Preston University (Pakistan), a private university in Pakistan
Preston University (United States), a private for-profit unaccredited institution that offers a variety of academic degree programs by distance learning
University of Central Lancashire, a public university based in Preston, England